Dizajrud may refer to:
Dizajrud-e Gharbi Rural District
Dizajrud-e Sharqi Rural District